Dorrel Norman Elvert "Whitey" Herzog (born November 9, 1931) is an American former professional baseball outfielder and manager, most notable for his Major League Baseball (MLB) managerial career.

He made his MLB debut as a player in 1956 with the Washington Senators. After his playing career ended in 1963, Herzog went on to perform a variety of roles in Major League Baseball, including scout, manager, coach, general manager, and farm system director.

As a scout and farm system director, he helped the New York Mets win the 1969 World Series. As a big-league manager, he led the Kansas City Royals to three consecutive playoff appearances from 1976 to 1978. Hired by Gussie Busch in 1980 to helm the St. Louis Cardinals, the team made three World Series appearances, winning the 1982 World Series over the Milwaukee Brewers and falling in 1985 and 1987.

He was inducted into the Baseball Hall of Fame on July 25, 2010, and was inducted into the St. Louis Cardinals Hall of Fame Museum on August 16, 2014.

Early life
Dorrell Herzog was born in New Athens, Illinois, the second of three children of Edgar and Lietta Herzog. His father worked at a brewery and his mother at a shoe factory there. Whitey attended New Athens High School where he played basketball and baseball. He drew interest from the college basketball programs at Saint Louis University and Illinois. As a youth, Herzog delivered newspapers, sold baked goods from a truck, dug graves, and worked at the brewery with his father. He was known as "Relly" — a diminutive of Dorrel, his given first name.

His older brother Therron played a year of minor league baseball in 1954 in the Cotton States League.

Baseball career

As player
Herzog both batted and threw  left-handed. He was originally signed by the New York Yankees by scout Lou Maguolo. While playing for the McAlester Rockets in the Sooner State League in 1949 and 1950, a sportscaster gave Herzog the nickname "Whitey" due to his light blonde hair and resemblance to blonde Yankees pitcher Bob "The White Rat" Kuzava, (rather than the light blonde Yankee starter and future Hall of Famer Whitey Ford, then on the way to a 9-1 rookie season.  In 1953, during the Korean War, Herzog served the U.S. Army Corps of Engineers, during which time he was stationed at Fort Leonard Wood in Missouri and managed the camp's baseball team.

After being traded by New York while still a minor league  prospect, he played for the Washington Senators (1956–1958), Kansas City Athletics (1958–1960), Baltimore Orioles (1961–62) and Detroit Tigers (1963). In 634 games spread over eight seasons, Herzog batted .257 with 25 home runs, 172 runs batted in, 213 runs scored, 60 doubles, 20 triples, and 13 stolen bases. In reference to his relative success as a player versus being a manager, Herzog has said, "Baseball has been good to me since I quit trying to play it."

Player development
After his playing career ended, Herzog rejoined the Athletics for two seasons, as a scout in 1964 and a coach in 1965.

The next seven years were spent with the New York Mets, the first, in 1966, as the third-base coach for manager Wes Westrum. Beginning in 1967 Herzog then made his mark with the club during his six-year tenure as its director of player development. On his watch, the Mets produced young talent that either appeared on one or both of its 1969 and 1973 World Series teams in or were dealt and had successful major league careers elsewhere. Among it was Gary Gentry, Wayne Garrett, Jon Matlack, John Milner, Amos Otis and Ken Singleton. Herzog was a candidate to become the Mets' manager after the death of Gil Hodges prior to the 1972 season, but was passed over in favor of first-base coach Yogi Berra, a future Yankee Hall of Fame catcher and brief ex-Met player, by chairman of the board M. Donald Grant. He had been ordered to not attend Hodges' funeral by Grant's associates to avoid speculation.

Berra went on to take the team to within one game of the World Series championship in 1973.

As manager

Texas
Perceiving Grant's actions as a snub, Herzog left the Mets to accept the first managerial assignment of his career. On November 2, 1972, he signed a two-year contract to lead the Texas Rangers, the only MLB team have 100 losses in 1972. Hired based on recommendations from general manager Joe Burke to owner Bob Short, he’d been given the understanding that he was to help develop the team's young prospects. He immediately abandoned the platoon system used heavily by his predecessor Ted Williams.

His debut at the helm was a 3–1 Rangers loss to the Chicago White Sox at Arlington Stadium on April 7, 1973. His first victory was a 4–0 decision over the Kansas City Royals five nights later on April 12 at Royals Stadium.

He never got the chance to finish the 1973 season.  With the team mired deeply at 47-91, he was fired on September 7, three days after a home field 14–0 defeat at Comiskey Park Coach Del Wilber replaced him for one game, followed by Hall of Fame bound Billy Martin, who had been fired by the Detroit Tigers on August 30. Short defended the change by telling reporters, "If my mother were managing the Rangers and I had the opportunity to hire Billy Martin, I'd fire my mother."

California
Herzog joined the California Angels as their third-base coach in 1974. He was named the team's interim manager on June 27, 1974, the same day that his predecessor Bobby Winkles was fired and also Hall of Fame bound successor Dick Williams was hired. The first game he managed was a 5–0 win for the Angels, who split a four-game weekend series against the Rangers at Anaheim Stadium during his brief 4-game stint.

Kansas City Royals

Herzog succeeded Jack McKeon as manager of the Kansas City Royals on July 24, 1975, going on to helm the club from 1975 to 1979. At the time, the team was in second place in the American League West but trailed the defending and eventual division champion Oakland Athletics by 11 games. Th Royals went on to win three straight American League Western division titles from 1976 to 1978,

St. Louis

Herzog next managed the St. Louis Cardinals,  from 1980 to 1990).  He won the 1982 World Series, and both won the National League Pennant and appeared in the Series again in 1985 and 1987.

Herzog's final season with the Cardinals, and in his managerial career, was the 1990 season; he resigned on July 6 of that year with the team at 33–47 and in last place in the NL East. He jokingly stated, "I came here in last place and I leave here in last place. I left them right where I started." His overall Cardinals record is 822 wins and 728 losses.

Career record
In total, Herzog led six division winners, three pennant winners, and one World Series winner in compiling a 1,281–1,125 (.532) career record.

As general manager
With his extensive background in player development, Herzog also was a major league general manager with both the Cardinals (1980–82) and the California Angels from 1993 to 1994.

Cardinals
Herzog succeeded interim skipper Jack Krol as manager of the Cardinals on June 9, 1980, managed for 73 games, then moved into the club's front office as GM on August 26, turning the team over to Red Schoendienst. During the offseason, Herzog reclaimed the manager job, then held both the GM and field manager posts with St. Louis for almost two full seasons, during which he acquired or promoted many players who would star on the Cardinals' three World Series teams of the 1980s. In a 1983 poll of MLB players by The New York Times, Herzog was voted best manager in baseball.

Angels

Herzog served as general manager of the California Angels from 1993 to 1994.

Whiteyball

Herzog's style of play, based on the strategy of attrition, was nicknamed "Whiteyball" and concentrated on pitching, speed, and defense to win games rather than on home runs. Herzog's lineups generally consisted of one or more base-stealing threats at the top of the lineup, with a power threat such as George Brett or Jack Clark hitting third or fourth, protected by one or two productive hitters, followed by more base stealers. This tactic kept payrolls low, while allowing Herzog to win consistently in stadiums with deep fences and artificial turf, both of which were characteristics of Royals Stadium (now Kauffman Stadium) and Busch Memorial Stadium during his managerial career.

A less noticed (at the time) aspect of Herzog's offensive philosophy was his preference for patient hitters with high on-base percentages: such players included Royals Brett, Hal McRae, and Amos Otis, and Cardinals Clark, Keith Hernandez, José Oquendo, and Ozzie Smith, as well as Darrell Porter, who played for Herzog in both Kansas City and St. Louis. However, in St. Louis Herzog also employed free-swinging hitters who were less patient but speedy runners and fielders, such as six-time (consecutively, the first three +triple-digit) NL stolen base champion Vince Coleman and 1985 NL MVP Willie McGee.

Later years
Herzog expressed an interest in becoming President of the National League when that job opened in 1986. The role eventually went to Yale University President A. Bartlett Giamatti, who also became the Commissioner of baseball in 1989. In a nationally televised interview on NBC, after Giamatti accepted the job of NL President, Marv Albert jokingly asked Herzog if he would be interested in the job opening for President of Yale University. Herzog replied, "Well, you're trying to be funny now, Marv. I don't think that's funny at all."

Both Herzog and ex-Florida Marlins World Series winning manager Jim Leyland were candidates to become manager of the Boston Red Sox following the 1996 season. Both rejected offers from the Red Sox, so the team hired Jimy Williams instead. Herzog was elected to the Baseball Hall of Fame by the Veterans' Committee on December 7, 2009, receiving 14 of a possible 16 votes.

Hall of Fame
Herzog was elected to the baseball Hall of Fame in 2010, and inducted that July 25.

In addition, the Cardinals retired the number '24', which he wore during his managerial tenure with the club, in his honor on July 31, following his induction. Rick Ankiel was the last Cardinal to wear number 24.

Personal life

Herzog continues to reside in St. Louis, Missouri. His younger brother, Codell ("Butz") died on February 20, 2010, at 76. He made out Whitey's first lineup with the Cardinals in 1980. His grandson John Urick was a minor league first baseman and outfielder from 2003 until 2010 who played for managers and former Herzog-era Cardinals Garry Templeton and Hal Lanier.

In January 2014, the Cardinals announced Herzog among 22 former players and personnel to be inducted into the St. Louis Cardinals Hall of Fame Museum for the inaugural class of 2014.

See also

 List of Major League Baseball managers by wins

References

External links

Whitey Herzog at SABR (Baseball BioProject)
Baseball Hall of Fame – 2008 Veterans Committee candidate profile

1931 births
Living people
American sportsmen
Baseball coaches from Illinois
Baseball players from Illinois
Baltimore Orioles players
California Angels coaches
California Angels managers
California Angels executives
Detroit Tigers players
Kansas City Athletics coaches
Kansas City Athletics players
Kansas City Athletics scouts
Kansas City Royals managers
Major League Baseball farm directors
Major League Baseball general managers
Major League Baseball managers with retired numbers
Major League Baseball outfielders
Major League Baseball third base coaches
Manager of the Year Award winners
McAlester Rockets players
National Baseball Hall of Fame inductees
New York Mets coaches
New York Mets executives
People from St. Clair County, Illinois
St. Louis Cardinals managers
St. Louis Cardinals executives
Texas Rangers managers
United States Army Corps of Engineers personnel
Washington Senators (1901–1960) players
Her